Stephen Sambu (born July 7, 1988, in Kenya) is a Kenyan long distance runner who specialises in road running competitions.

College career
Stephen Sambu ran for the University of Arizona, where he was coached by James Li, who is also Bernard Lagat's long-term coach. For the Arizona Wildcats he was runner-up in the 10,000 meters at the 2012 NCAA Division I Outdoor Track and Field Championships, runner-up at the 2012 NCAA Men's Division I Cross Country Championship, and a 9-time All-American. At Rend Lake College in Ina, Illinois, he captured 10 individual national championships, including two National Junior College Athletic Association (NJCAA) national cross country titles.

2013 season
He won the 2013 B.A.A. 10K.

2014 season
Sambu won the 2014 editions of the Falmouth Road Race, Cherry Blossom Ten Mile Run, B.A.A. 10K, and UAE Healthy Kidney 10K.

2015 season
He won the 2015 editions of the Great Manchester Run, Falmouth Road Race, Cherry Blossom Ten Mile Run.

2016 season
Sambu won the 2016 New York City Half Marathon.
He also won the Bank of America Shamrock Shuffle 8k in Chicago.

References

External links

1988 births
Living people
Kenyan male long-distance runners
Arizona Wildcats men's track and field athletes
Arizona Wildcats men's cross country runners